John Lescroart established the Maurice Prize in Fiction, which has been awarded annually since 2005. The prize is hosted jointly by John and the University of California, Davis English Department. The prize is a gift from John in honor of his father, Maurice, for whom the contest is named.  The prize was increased from $5,000 to $10,000 beginning in 2022.

The Maurice prize is awarded for the best sustained work of fiction (a novel, novel in stories, or other sustained book-length prose fiction form) submitted by alumni who have not yet published or had a book-length manuscript in fiction accepted for publication by the contest deadline. Literary merit is the over-riding criterion in the selection of the winning entry. It is John’s hope to inspire UC Davis graduates to publish their literary work.

Recipients
2005 Spring Warren, The Breaks 
2006 Shawna Yang Ryan, Water Ghosts (Penguin Press, 2009), originally released as Locke 1928 (El Leon Literary Arts)
2007 Elizabeth Chamberlin these people, they crawl all over the place [Judge: Fenton Johnson]
2008 Melanie Thorne, Hand Me Down (Dutton, 2012) [Judge: Clifford Chase]
2009 Angie Chau, A Map Back to You (released as Quiet As They Come, by IG Publishing, 2010) [Judge: Robin Romm]
2010 Melinda Moustakis, Bear Down, Bear North (University of Georgia Press, 2011) [Judge: Benjamin Percy]
2011 Maria Kuznetsova, The Accident [Judge: Summer Wood]
2012 Cora Stryker, The Evolution of Flight [Judge: Christian Kiefer]
2013 Naomi Williams, Landfalls (Farrar, Straus and Giroux; 1st edition August 4, 2015) [Judge: Josh Weil]
2014 Kiik Araki-Kawaguchi, Poor as You Are, My Heart, Don’t Grieve Here in Earth [Judge: Manuel Muñoz]
2015 Reema Rajbanshi, Sugar, Smoke, Song [Judge: Ramona Ausubel]
2016 Megan Cummins, Beasts [Judge: Bich Minh Nguyen]
2017 Ben Hinshaw, Exactly What You Mean, A Novel in Stories [Judge: Samantha Dunn]
2018 No prize awarded (program hiatus)
2019 Peter Shahrokh, A Wind Will Come
2020 Laura Marsh, SAV AGE(S)
2021 No prize awarded
2022 Kirk Colvin, Bloodless Coup

References

American fiction awards
Awards by university and college in the United States
Awards established in 2005
University of California, Davis
Awards honoring alumni